Wen Jia (Wen Chia, traditional Chinese: 文嘉, simplified Chinese: 文嘉, pinyin: Wénjiā); ca. 1501-1583 was a Chinese painter of landscapes and flowers during the Ming Dynasty (1368–1644).

Wen was born in the Jiangsu province. His style name was 'Xiu Cheng' and his sobriquet was 'Wen Shui'. Wen came from a family of painters. He was the second son of Wen Zhengming, and his brother Wen Peng became a painter as well.

References

1501 births
1583 deaths
Painters from Suzhou
Ming dynasty landscape painters